Road Commission Airport , also known as Road Commission Nr 1 Airport, is a public-use airport located three nautical miles (4 mi, 6 km) south of the central business district of Denali, in the Matanuska-Susitna Borough of the U.S. state of Alaska.

The airport is located near the Denali Highway bridge crossing the Susitna River.

Facilities and aircraft 
The airport has one runway designated 16/34 with a gravel and dirt surface measuring 1,000 by 22 feet (305 x 7 m). For the 12-month period ending December 31, 2005, the airport had 70 aircraft operations, an average of 5 per month: 71% general aviation and 29% air taxi.

References

External links 
FAA Alaska airport diagram (GIF)
Topographic map from USGS The National Map

Airports in Matanuska-Susitna Borough, Alaska